Living Targets is the third album from German punk rock band, Beatsteaks. It was released in August, 2002 on Epitaph Records as was previous album, Launched, in 2000. There was one line-up change from the previous album – Torsten Scholz took over bass duties from Alexander Roßwaag. The album featured more hard rock tracks than previous efforts, including songs which were far slower and more melodic and structured. It aided the band's breakthrough into the mainstream which was completed on 2004's Smack Smash – released on Epitaph Records and WEA.

Track listing
"Not Ready to Rock" (Teutoburg, Götz, Kurtzke) – 1:27
"God Knows" (Teutoburg, Baumann)		– 2:32
"Let Me In" (Teutoburg, Baumann)		– 3:32
"Soothe Me" (Götz)				– 2:30
"Above Us" (Teutoburg, Kurtzke, Baumann, Götz)	– 3:03
"This One" (Teutoburg, Baumann)		– 2:47
"Disconnected"	(Teutoburg, Kurtzke, Baumann)	– 3:05
"A-Way" (Götz, Scholz)				– 3:40
"Mirrored" (Kurtzke, Scholz)	                – 3:48
"Run Run" (Teutoburg, Baumann)			– 2:55
"To Be Strong" (Teutoburg)			– 2:49
"Summer" (Teutoburg, Baumann, Götz, Kurtzke)	– 6:40
Track 12 is only actually 3:25, the remainder is a hidden track, "Yeah!"

Credits
Arnim Teutoburg-Weiß	–	vocals, guitar
Peter Baumann	–	guitar
Bernd Kurtzke	–	guitar
Torsten Scholz	–	bass
Thomas Götz	–	drums
Alexander Freund – cello on "Mirrored"
Pamela Falcone – backing vocals on "Yeah!"
 Engineered by Gerd Krueger
 Assistant engineered by Torsten Otto

Tracks 1, 3, 4, 6, 9, 12
 Recorded and mixed at Minirock Studio, Cologne, Germany
 Produced by Uwe Sabirowsky

Tracks 2, 5, 7, 8, 10
 Recorded at Tritonus, Berlin, Germany
 Produced by Billy Gould

External links
Beatsteaks official website
Epitaph Records album page

2002 albums
Beatsteaks albums
Epitaph Records albums